The 2016–17 KBL season was the 21st season of the Korean Basketball League (KBL), the highest level of basketball in South Korea. Anyang KGC won its second KBL championship.

Clubs

Regular season

Playoffs

References

External links
  

Korean Basketball League seasons
2016–17 in South Korean basketball